Machon Meir is a religious Zionist outreach organization and yeshiva situated in the Jerusalem neighborhood of Kiryat Moshe, close to Givat Shaul. Machon Meir is one of the larger outreach organization in Israel, and is strongly associated with nationalist politics and the settler movement.

History & Ideology

Machon Meir was founded shortly after the Yom Kippur War in 1973, by Rabbi Dov Bigon. Rabbi Bigon himself was educated at Mercaz HaRav under Rav Zvi Yehuda Kook, and so while Machon Meir is not officially affiliated with Mercaz HaRav, the two have very similar ideologies. 

Machon Meir was founded as an outreach yeshiva and as such is geared towards students with less formal Jewish education and/or little knowledge of the Hebrew language.

Machon Meir encourages full participation in Israeli society and the Israel Defense Forces.

Programs
In Jerusalem, the Machon Meir yeshiva offers full-time, intensive study programs for young Jewish men of all backgrounds and levels of knowledge  in Hebrew, English, French, Spanish, Portuguese and Russian languages. 
Areas of study include Hebrew Bible, Talmud, the writings of Rabbi Abraham Isaac Kook, history, Musar literature, philosophy and a men-only Hebrew ulpan. See Yeshiva #Curriculum.
Machon Meir is also a common destination for non-Jews from all over the world seeking an orthodox conversion to Judaism that will be recognised by the State of Israel.

Machon Meir has a sister organization, Machon Ora, with study programs for young women in Hebrew, French, Spanish, and Russian.

References

External links
 Official Machon Meir English Department website

Orthodox Jewish outreach
Orthodox yeshivas in Jerusalem
Religious Zionist yeshivot
Educational institutions established in 1973
Baalei teshuva institutions
1973 establishments in Israel